Matthew Richard Stone (born May 26, 1971) is an American actor, animator, filmmaker, and composer. He is known for co-creating South Park (since 1997) and The Book of Mormon (2011) with his creative partner Trey Parker. Stone was interested in film and music as a child and at high school, and attended the University of Colorado Boulder, where he met Parker. The two collaborated on various short films, and starred in the feature-length musical Cannibal! The Musical (1993).

Stone and Parker moved to Los Angeles and wrote their second film, Orgazmo (1997). Before the premiere of the film, South Park premiered on Comedy Central in August 1997. The duo possess full creative control of the show, and have produced music and video games based on it. A film based on the series, South Park: Bigger, Longer & Uncut (1999), received good reviews from both critics and fans. Stone went on to write, produce, and star in the satirical action film Team America: World Police (2004), and, after several years of development, The Book of Mormon premiered on Broadway to good reviews.

Stone has been the recipient of various awards over the course of his career, including five Primetime Emmy Awards for his work on South Park, as well as three Tony Awards and one Grammy Award for The Book of Mormon.

Early life
Stone was born on May 26, 1971, in Houston, Texas, to economics professor Gerald Whitney Stone and Sheila Lois (Belasco). He is of Irish-American heritage from his father's side and Jewish heritage from his mother's side. The South Park characters Gerald and Sheila Broflovski were named after them. Stone and his younger sister Rachel were raised in Littleton, Colorado, a suburb of Denver, where they attended Heritage High School. He attended the University of Colorado Boulder. His father was worried he would "become a musician and a bum", so he insisted that his son major in something "practical". They compromised on Matt's majoring in both mathematics and film. Stone graduated with a double-major Bachelor of Arts degree in 1993.

Career

Career beginnings

Cannibal! The Musical (1992–1994)
In 1992, Stone, Parker, McHugh, and Ian Hardin founded a production company named the Avenging Conscience. The company was named after the D. W. Griffith film by the same title (which was actively disliked by the group.) Parker employed the cutout paper technique on Avenging Conscience's first production, Jesus vs. Frosty (1992), an animated short pitting the religious figure against Frosty the Snowman.

The quartet created a three-minute trailer for a fictional film titled Alferd Packer: The Musical. The idea was based on an obsession Parker had with Alferd Packer, a real nineteenth-century prospector accused of cannibalism. During this time, Parker had become engaged to long-time girlfriend Liane Adamo, but their relationship fell apart shortly before production on the trailer began. "Horribly depressed", Parker funneled his frustrations with her into the project, naming Packer's "beloved but disloyal" horse after her. The trailer became something of a sensation among students at the school, leading Virgil Grillo, the chairman and founder of the university's film department, to convince the quartet to expand it to a feature-length film. Parker wrote the film's script, creating an Oklahoma!-style musical featuring ten original show tunes. The group raised $125,000 from family and friends and began shooting the film. The movie was shot on Loveland Pass as winter was ending, and the crew endured the freezing weather. Parker – under the pseudonym Juan Schwartz – was the film's star, director and co-producer.

Alferd Packer: The Musical premiered in Boulder in October 1993; "they rented a limousine that circled to ferry every member of the cast and crew from the back side of the block to the red carpet at the theater's entrance." The group submitted the movie to the Sundance Film Festival, who did not respond. Parker told McHugh he had a "vision" they needed to be at the festival, which resulted in the group renting out a conference room in a nearby hotel and putting on their own screenings. MTV did a short news segment on The Big Picture regarding the film, and they made industry connections through the festival. They intended to sell video rights to the film for $1 million and spend the remaining $900,000 to create another film. The film was instead sold to Troma Entertainment in 1996 where it was retitled Cannibal! The Musical, and upon the duo's later success, it became their biggest-selling title. It has since been labeled a "cult classic" and adapted into a stage play by community theater groups and even high schools nationwide.

The Spirit of Christmas and Orgazmo (1995–1997)
Following the film's success, the group, without Hardin, moved to Los Angeles. Upon arrival, they met a lawyer for the William Morris Agency who connected them with producer Scott Rudin. As a result, the duo acquired a lawyer, an agent, and a script deal. Despite initially believing themselves to be on the verge of success, the duo struggled for several years. Stone slept on dirty laundry for upwards of a year because he could not afford to purchase a mattress. They unsuccessfully pitched a children's program titled Time Warped to Fox Kids, which would have involved fictionalized stories of people in history. The trio created two separate pilots, spaced a year apart, and despite the approval of Fox Broadcasting Company development executive Pam Brady, the network disbanded the Fox Kids division.

David Zucker, who was a fan of Cannibal!, contacted the duo to produce a 15-minute short film for Seagram to show at a party for its acquisition of Universal Studios. Due to a misunderstanding, Parker and Stone improvised much of the film an hour before it was shot, creating it as a spoof of 1950s instructional videos. The result, Your Studio and You, features numerous celebrities, including Sylvester Stallone, Demi Moore, and Steven Spielberg. "You could probably make a feature film out of the experience of making that movie because it was just two dudes from college suddenly directing Steven Spielberg", Parker later remarked, noting that the experience was difficult for the two.

During the time between shooting the pilots for Time Warped, Parker penned the script for a film titled Orgazmo, which later entered production. Half of the budget for the picture came from a Japanese porn company called Kuki, who wanted to feature its performers in mainstream Western media. Independent distributor October Films purchased the rights to the film for one million dollars after its screening at the Toronto International Film Festival. The film received an NC-17 rating from the Motion Picture Association of America, which resulted in the poor box office performance of the film. Parker and Stone attempted to negotiate with the organization on what to delete from the final print, but the MPAA would not give specific notes. The duo later theorized that the organization cared less because it was an independent distributor which would bring it significantly less money.

Fox executive Brian Graden cut Parker and Stone a personal check of a few thousand dollars to produce a video greeting card he could deliver to friends; the film would be a sequel to their earlier short Jesus vs. Frosty. Graden sent the film on a VHS to several industry executives in Hollywood; meanwhile, someone digitized the clip and put it up on the Internet, where it became one of the first viral videos. Due to the popularity of Jesus vs. Santa, Parker and Stone wanted to turn the short into a television series later entitled South Park, and offered the show to Fox. While Fox executives were enthusiastic about the premise, they didn't want to air a show that included the talking poo character Mr. Hankey and passed on it after the duo refused to remove the character several times. Parker and Stone then entered negotiations with both MTV and Comedy Central. Parker preferred the show be produced by Comedy Central, fearing that MTV would turn it into a kids' show. When Comedy Central executive Doug Herzog watched the short, he commissioned the development of the show into a series.

South Park

Premiere and initial success (1997–1998)
The pilot episode of South Park was made on a budget of $300,000, and took between three and three and a half months to complete, and animation took place in a small room at Celluloid Studios, in Denver, Colorado, during the summer of 1996. Similar to Parker and Stone's Christmas shorts, the original pilot was animated entirely with traditional cut paper stop motion animation techniques. The idea for the town of South Park came from the real Colorado basin of the same name where, according to the creators, a lot of folklore and news reports originated about "cattle mutilations and UFO and bigfoot sightings."

South Park premiered in August 1997 and immediately became one of the most popular shows on cable television, averaging consistently between 3.5 and 5.5 million viewers. The show transformed the then-fledgling Comedy Central into "a cable industry power almost overnight". At the time, the cable network had a low distribution of just 21 million subscribers. Comedy Central marketed the show aggressively before its launch, billing it as "why they created the V-chip." The resulting buzz led to the network earning an estimated $30 million in T-shirts sales alone before the first episode was even aired. Due to the success of the series' first six episodes, Comedy Central requested an additional seven; the series completed its first season in February 1998. An affiliate of the MTV Network until then, Comedy Central decided, in part due to the success of South Park, to have its own independent sales department. By the end of 1998, Comedy Central had sold more than $150 million worth of merchandise for the show, including T-shirts and dolls. Over the next few years, Comedy Central's viewership spiked largely due to South Park, adding 3 million new subscribers in the first half of 1998 alone and allowed the network to sign international deals with networks in several countries.

Parker and Stone became celebrities as a result of the program's success; Parker noted that the success of South Park allowed him to pursue, for a time, a lifestyle that involved partying with women and "out-of-control binges" in Las Vegas. Their philosophy of taking every deal (which had surfaced as a result of their lack of trust in the early success of South Park) led to their appearances in films, albums, and outside script deals. Among these included BASEketball, a 1998 comedy film that became a critical and commercial flop.

Bigger, Longer, and Uncut and continued success (1999–present)

Parker and Stone signed a deal with Comedy Central in April 1998 that contracted the duo to producing South Park episodes until 1999, gave them a slice of the lucrative spinoff merchandising the show generated within its first year, as well as an unspecified seven-figure cash bonus to bring the show to the big screen, in theaters. During the time, the team was also busy writing the second and third seasons of the series, the former of which Parker and Stone later described as "disastrous". As such, they figured the phenomenon would be over soon, and they decided to write a personal, fully committed musical. Parker and Stone fought with the MPAA to keep the film R-rated; for months the ratings board insisted on the more prohibitive NC-17. The film was only certified an R rating two weeks prior to its release, following contentious conversations between Parker/Stone, Rudin, and Paramount Pictures. Parker felt very overwhelmed and overworked during the production process of the film, especially between April and the movie's opening in late June. He admitted that press coverage, which proclaimed the end of South Park was near, bothered him. The film opened in cinemas in June 1999 and received critical acclaim while grossing $83 million at the box office.

Parker and Stone continue to write, direct, and voice most characters on South Park. Over time, the show has adopted a unique production process, in which an entire episode is written, animated and broadcast in one week. Parker and Stone state that subjecting themselves to a one-week deadline creates more spontaneity amongst themselves in the creative process, which they feel results in a funnier show. Although initial reviews for the show were negative in reference to its crass humor, the series has received numerous accolades, including five Primetime Emmy Awards, one Peabody Award, and numerous inclusions in various publications' lists of greatest television shows. As of 2011 its viewership was lower than at the height of its popularity in its earliest seasons, but South Park remained one of the highest-rated series on Comedy Central. In 2012, South Park cut back from producing 14 episodes per year (seven in the spring and seven in the fall) to a single run of 10 episodes in the fall, to allow the duo to explore other projects the rest of the year. The show is currently renewed through 2022, when it will reach its twenty-sixth season.

South Park has expanded to music and video games. Comedy Central released various albums, including Chef Aid: The South Park Album and Mr. Hankey's Christmas Classics, in the late 1990s. The song "Chocolate Salty Balls" (as sung by the character Chef) was released as a single in the UK in 1998 to support the Chef Aid: The South Park Album and became a number one hit. Parker and Stone had little to do with the development of video games based on the series that were released at this time, but took full creative control of South Park: The Stick of Truth, a 2014 video game based on the series that received positive reviews and for which they won the 2014 Writing in a Comedy award and Stone (as Various) was nominated for Performance in a Comedy, Supporting by National Academy of Video Game Trade Reviewers (NAVGTR). Broadcast syndication rights to South Park were sold in 2003, and all episodes are available for free full-length on-demand legal streaming on the official South Park Studios website. In 2007, the duo, with the help of their lawyer, Kevin Morris, cut a 50–50 joint venture with Comedy Central on all revenue not related to television; this includes digital rights to South Park, as well as movies, soundtracks, T-shirts and other merchandise, in a deal worth $75 million.

Television and film projects

That's My Bush! (2000–2001)
In 2000, Parker and Stone began plotting a television sitcom starring the winner of the 2000 Presidential election. The duo were "95 percent sure" that Democratic candidate Al Gore would win, and tentatively titled the show Everybody Loves Al (a play on the show Everybody Loves Raymond). The main goal was to parody sitcom tropes, such as a lovable main character, the sassy maid, and the wacky neighbor, in the context of the White House household. Parker said the producers did not want to make fun of politics, but instead lampoon sitcoms. They threw a party the night of the election with the writers, with intentions to begin writing the following Monday and shooting the show in January 2001 with the inauguration. With the confusion of whom the President would be, the show's production was pushed back. The show was filmed at Sony Pictures Studios, and was the first time Parker and Stone shot a show on a production lot.

Although That's My Bush!, which ran between April–May 2001, received a fair amount of publicity and critical notice, according to Stone and Parker, the cost per episode was too high at "about $1 million an episode". Comedy Central officially cancelled the series in August 2001 as a cost-cutting move; Stone was quoted as saying "A super-expensive show on a small cable network ... the economics of it were just not going to work." Comedy Central continued the show in reruns, considering it a creative and critical success. Parker believed the show would not have survived after the September 11 attacks anyway, and Stone agreed, saying the show would not "play well". During this time, the duo also signed a deal with Shockwave.com to produce 39 animated online shorts, in which they would retain full artistic control; the result, Princess, was rejected after only two episodes.

Team America (2002–2004)
In 2002, the duo began working on Team America: World Police, a satire of big-budget action films and their associated clichés and stereotypes, with particular humorous emphasis on the global implications of the politics of the United States. Team America was produced using a crew of about 200 people; sometimes four people at a time were needed to manipulate a marionette. Although the filmmakers hired three dozen highly skilled marionette operators, execution of some very simple acts by the marionettes proved to be very difficult, with a simple shot such as a character drinking taking a half-day to complete successfully. The deadline for the film's completion took a toll on both filmmakers, as did various difficulties in working with puppets, with Stone, who described the film as "the worst time of [his] life", resorting to coffee to work 20-hour days and sleeping pills to enable him to rest. The film was barely completed in time for its October release date, but reviews were positive and the film made a modest sum at the box office.

Broadway and movie studio

The Book of Mormon (2011–present)
Parker and Stone, alongside writer-composer Robert Lopez, began working on a musical centering on Mormonism during the production of Team America. Lopez, a fan of South Park and creator of the puppet musical Avenue Q, met with the duo after a performance of the musical, where they conceived the idea. The musical, titled The Book of Mormon: The Musical of the Church of Jesus Christ of Latter-day Saints, was worked on over a period of various years; working around their South Park schedule, they flew between New York City and Los Angeles often, first writing songs for the musical in 2006. Developmental workshops began in 2008, and the crew embarked on the first of a half-dozen workshops that would take place during the next four years. Originally, producer Scott Rudin planned to stage The Book of Mormon off-Broadway at the New York Theatre Workshop in Summer 2010, but opted to premiere it directly on Broadway, "[s]ince the guys [Parker and Stone] work best when the stakes are highest."

After a frantic series of rewrites, rehearsals, and previews, The Book of Mormon premiered on Broadway at the Eugene O'Neill Theatre on March 24, 2011. The Book of Mormon received broad critical praise for the plot, score, actors' performances, direction and choreography. A cast recording of the original Broadway production became the highest-charting Broadway cast album in over four decades. The musical received nine Tony Awards, one for Best Musical, and a Grammy Award for Best Musical Theater Album. The production has since expanded to two national tours, a Chicago production, and a UK production, and Parker and Stone have confirmed a film adaption is in pre-production.

Important Studios and future projects (2013–present)
On January 14, 2013, Stone and Parker announced that they would be starting a film production company called Important Studios. Inspired by the production work of Lucasfilm and DreamWorks, Stone and Parker considered founding the studio for approximately two years before committing. The initial financial assets of the studio are valued at $300 million, with the majority of the money originating from South Park, The Book of Mormon, while $60 million is from an investment from Joseph Ravitch of the Raine Group, giving him a 20 percent minority stock.

In the midst of the COVID-19 pandemic, Parker, Stone, and Peter Serafinowicz created a web series, Sassy Justice. The series uses deepfake technology to insert unrelated celebrities and politicians into the fictional world of a television reporter. The first episode was posted to YouTube on October26, 2020. The team was originally assembled for a film project that was interrupted due to the pandemic, who made the video based on a series of impressions that Serafinowicz developed of a "sassy" Donald Trump. The creators have a handful of shorter videos alongside a 15-minute first episode that may be turned into an ongoing series, film, or other type of project.

In 2021, Stone and Parker signed a $900 million deal with Paramount Global to make six additional seasons of South Park and 14 movies in the South Park universe for streaming.

On January 13, 2022, it was announced Parker will produce an untitled film with Matt Stone through their now-renamed production company Parker County and Kendrick Lamar and Dave Free's multi-disciplinary media company PGLang. It will be distributed by Paramount Pictures. The live-action film comedy, written by Vernon Chatham, addresses racial issues. Production is expected to begin in the spring of 2024.

Personal life
Stone met Angela Howard, a Comedy Central executive in 2001 and they began a relationship shortly after. They got married in 2008, and have two children together. Stone and his family live in Venice, Los Angeles.

Stone has described himself as ethnically Jewish due to his mother being Jewish. He is an atheist.

Stone said in 2001, regarding his political views, "I hate conservatives, but I really fucking hate liberals." In 2006, Stone described himself as libertarian.

Discography

Albums

Soundtrack albums

Cast recording

Filmography and accolades

 Cannibal! The Musical (1993)
 Orgazmo (1997)
 BASEketball (1998)
 South Park: Bigger, Longer & Uncut (1999)
 Terror Firmer (1999)
 Bowling for Columbine (2002)
 Run Ronnie Run (2002)
 Team America: World Police (2004)
 The Aristocrats (2005)
 This Film Is Not Yet Rated (2006)
 Electric Apricot: Quest for Festeroo (2007)
 Rush: Beyond the Lighted Stage (2010)
 South Park: Post Covid (2021)
 South Park: Post Covid: The Return of Covid (2021)
 South Park: The Streaming Wars (2022)
 South Park: The Streaming Wars Part 2 (2022)

References

External links
 Matt Stone and Trey Parker at the Official South Park Website
 
 
 Fresh Air Interview
 

1971 births
Living people
20th-century American comedians
20th-century American male actors
20th-century American male singers
20th-century American writers
21st-century American comedians
21st-century American male actors
21st-century American male singers
21st-century American writers
American animated film producers
Jewish American atheists
American comedy musicians
American film producers
American libertarians
American male comedians
American male film actors
American male screenwriters
American male singer-songwriters
American male television actors
American male television writers
American male video game actors
American male voice actors
American music video directors
American musical theatre composers
American musical theatre librettists
American musical theatre lyricists
American people of Irish descent
American parodists
American satirists
American television directors
American television writers
Animators from Texas
Annie Award winners
Broadway composers and lyricists
Business duos
Drama Desk Award winners
Film directors from Texas
Film directors from Colorado
Filmmaking duos
Grammy Award winners
Jewish American male comedians
Jewish American male actors
Jewish American writers
Jewish American comedians
Laurence Olivier Award winners
Male actors from Colorado
Male critics of feminism
New York Drama Critics' Circle Award winners
Peabody Award winners
People from Houston
People from Littleton, Colorado
People from the Denver metropolitan area
Primetime Emmy Award winners
Parody musicians
Parody film directors
Screenwriters from Texas
Screenwriters from Colorado
Screenwriting duos
Showrunners
Singer-songwriters from Colorado
Singer-songwriters from Texas
Television producers from Texas
Tony Award winners
University of Colorado Boulder alumni